The Great Western Tiers are a collection of mountain bluffs that form the northern edge of the Central Highlands plateau in Tasmania, Australia. The bluffs are contained within the Tasmanian Wilderness World Heritage Site.

During the late 19th century the Tiers were known as the Great Western Range.

Features
The Central Highlands, or Tasmanian central plateau, was uplifted from the lower Meander Valley, most probably in the Eocene epoch though possibly earlier, forming the Tiers' escarpment.  The plateau's north-east boundary, which ranges from –, originated in extensive Tertiary faulting.

This escarpment divides the high, rocky, sparsely inhabited central plateau from the fertile lower land of the Meander Valley and the northern midlands. The edge of the tiers have prominent cliffs and columns of Jurassic dolerite. The highest peak in the tiers is the  Ironstone Mountain. Unlike most of the bluffs this mountain is not visible from the Meander Valley, but is south of the escarpment. The escarpment has a distinct concave profile. Cliffs and scree slopes are common features. The dolerite is so prominent as the older rocks that overlay them are softer and have been eroded away. In places dolerite columns have collapsed into scree slopes.

The face of the tiers has been eroded and retreated approximately  since their formation, leaving the mountain Quamby Bluff as a solitary outlier. The central plateau's landform has been changed by glaciation. Valleys under the tiers are filled with talus, mostly bounders with a 25% mix of soil formed from boulder weathering.

Peaks 
The peaks and bluffs of the Great Western Tiers include:
Named after the bushranger Matthew Brady.
 Billop Bluff
Origin of the Liffey River.
 Ironstone Mountain, at 
 Millers Bluff, at 
 Mother Cummings Peak, at 
 Mount Blackwood
 Mount Parmeener
 Neals Bluff
 Panorama Hill
 Projection Bluff
 Quamby Bluff, at 
 Western Bluff, at

Gallery

See also

 List of highest mountains of Tasmania

References

Bibliography

Central Highlands (Tasmania)
Mountains of Tasmania